Veron may refer to:

People
 Aníbal Verón (died 2000), Argentine political martyr
 Danilinho (footballer, born 1987), Brazilian footballer
 Darío Verón (born 1979), Paraguayan footballer
 Eliseo Verón (born 1935), Argentine sociologist and semiotician
 Elmo Veron (1903–1990), American film editor
 François Véron (1575–1649), French Jesuit controversialist
 John Veron or Charlie Veron (born 1945), biologist specializing in coral
 Juan Ramón Verón (born 1944), Argentine footballer
 Juan Sebastián Verón (born 1975), Argentine footballer
 Luis Alberto Veron (born 1992), Argentine boxer
 Louis-Désiré Véron (1798–1867), French opera manager and publisher
 Mauricio Verón (born 1977), Argentine footballer
 Philippe Véron (1939–2014), French astronomer
 Pierre Véron (writer) (1833–1900), French journalist and writer
 Pierre Véron (lawyer) (born 1947), French lawyer and specialist in the field of patent litigation
 Ricardo Matias Verón (born 1981), Argentine footballer

Other uses
 Véron, a village in Burgundy, France
 Veron (grape), another name for the French wine grape Fer